Felicity Jones (her pen name, born 1988) is an American naturist blogging pseudonymously for Young Naturists America. From  Newton, New Jersey, Jones is known for her activism in the nudism and feminism movements. Jones is a feminist who promotes female self-acceptance feminist thinking and opposes fat shaming. She encourages acceptance of sexuality and social nudism in daily life. Felicity has been a contributor for magazines such as Failure Magazine and Internaturally. 

Jones is one of the co-founders of Young Naturists America. Her blog, created in November 2010, is part of the Young Naturists America site. It contains a variety of topics such as nudism, social nude activities, feminism, and art projects. Since the creation of her blog, she has been interviewed by a number of news publications seeking information about nudism and specifically the Young Nudist Movement.

Over the time that she has been publishing, she has been steadily shifting focus. When she first started, Jones' blog posts were mostly about the nudist movement and her own personal experiences growing up as a third-generation nudist in America. In early 2011, Jones began writing about a broader range of topics. She believes the United States has many core social issues that could be greatly diminished by incorporating more social nudity into people's lives. Some of the broader social issues she now talks about on her blog include feminism, sexuality, body image, fat shaming, cyber bullying and topfreedom.

Jones takes part in social activism. With the aim of promoting body acceptance, she has participated in public art projects by artists such as Zefrey Throwell and body painter Andy Golub. While the art projects themselves are varied, they have all had a single common connecting factor, which is the incorporation of public nudity. As of May 2017, Felicity Jones is married to her Young Naturists America co-founder, whose pen-name is Jordan Blum.

2011 

In August 2011, Jones participated in a nude art project called Ocularpation: Wall Street by Zefrey Throwell. During this art performance she was arrested by the NYPD for disrupting the peace and for blocking traffic; the charges were dropped a few months later.

She has also been working to promote top-free rights for women and had her first Top Free Day In Central Park in the summer of 2011. During this event, she forced men to wear bras while the women were topless.

Later in 2011, Jones also participated in an additional performance, this time a week-long game of strip poker in the window of an art gallery titled "I'll Raise You One" by the same artist which was covered by the NY Post and The Village Voice.

2012 

An art performance involving body painting took place in July 2012 and was the brainchild of artist Andy Golub. Jones and a few other members of Young Naturists America got completely naked in Times Square and had their bodies painted by Golub. The performance attracted hundreds of spectators who clamored to get pictures of the naked models. This event was covered by Vice Magazine, which published an article titled: "Waiting for the panties to drop in Times Square." This prompted her response blog post, "Naked Body Painting in the Heart of New York City."

She was interviewed on October 19, 2012 by Hollywood Today for a piece about censorship titled "Censorship and Social Networks – violence is in. Nipples are out!"

2013 

On January 18, 2013, Jones was interviewed by the Wall Street Journal about an off Broadway naked comedy show that she co-produced.

On January 22, 2013, Jones was interviewed by the Chicago Tribune about the impending San Francisco anti nudity legislation as well as her thoughts about the current lack of younger people who are involved with naturism.

In February 2013, the Fire Island National Seashore authorities decided to close Fire Island's nude beach. Jones was interviewed with regards to this issue by both the New York Times as well as News Day. She was also cited in the Huffington Post and the Long Island News website.

On May 2, 2013, Jones was interviewed by Nancy Redd for Huffington Post Live. The segment was called "Let's Get Naked".

On August 3, 2013, Jones was interviewed by journalist Bill Briggs for a featured article on NBC News about the lack of young nudists in America. Jones was then quoted in a Digital Journal follow-up news article.

On August 4, 2013 as featured in the local news site The Citizen / AuburnPub.com, Jones attended the annual Northeast Naturist Festival in upstate New York. This festival is where naturists congregate and talk about issues facing the movement.

On November 7, 2013, reporter Hilary Cadigan wrote an article for Chiang Mai News titled "Naked Brunch." While the article mostly dealt with Thailand’s first clothing-optional resort, The Oriental Village, the reporter cited Felicity's article, "Why Women Should See Other Women’s Naked Bodies," as it dealt with body acceptance through social nudity.

2015 

On June 26, 2015, Felicity explained why naturism is a positive impact on body image - a central topic in her writings.

In July 2015, Jones was in a New York Observer article about nudism in New York.

She was also featured in New York Magazine in an article about meeting people on nude beaches.

2016 

In May 2016, Jones was interviewed in Self article "This Is What It's Like To Live Most Of Your Life Naked".  And in VICE article "We Asked a Young Nudist Why Young People Aren't Nudists Anymore".

Articles and blog 

She has written for publications such as Failure Magazine, Internaturally, and the Bulletin.

Jones contributed a recommendation to the New York Magazine article "How to Swim All By Yourself."

In her blog, Jones addresses issues of public nudity, home nudity, nudist events, challenges getting nudist clubs to adapt changing expectations, sex positivity and body acceptance.  For example, she has written "How To Be A Sex Positive Person", "Home Nudist Etiquette With Visitors", and "It’s Time for Nudist Clubs to Change Their Policies on Genital Jewelry".

See also 
 Body painting

References

External links 

1988 births
Living people
People from Newton, New Jersey
American bloggers
American naturists
Social nudity advocates